Martin Dent (8 February 1979 in Woking, UK) is an English-born Australian Olympian marathon runner, who ran at the 2012 Summer Olympics.  He made his season best time of 2 hours, 16 minutes and 29 seconds in the marathon in 28th place.

Dent attended Berkeley Vale Community High School on the Central Coast of New South Wales. This is the same school that produced Australia Rugby Union Wallaby star Adam Ashley-Cooper, Scottish and British Lions player Nathan Hines and NRL player and Wests Tigers Assistant Coach Paul Stringer.

Dent currently holds the record for the fastest time on Fiordland's Kepler_Challenge.

References

External links
 Martin Dent at IAAF

Living people
1979 births
Australian male marathon runners
Athletes (track and field) at the 2012 Summer Olympics
Olympic athletes of Australia
World Athletics Championships athletes for Australia
Athletes (track and field) at the 2010 Commonwealth Games
Athletes (track and field) at the 2014 Commonwealth Games
Commonwealth Games competitors for Australia
Sportspeople from Woking